Two Jacks is a 2012 comedy-drama film directed by Bernard Rose starring Sienna Miller and Danny Huston. It is an adaptation of Leo Tolstoy's 1856 short story "Two Hussars" and is Rose's fifth Tolstoy adaptation, following Anna Karenina (1997), Ivans XTC (2002), The Kreutzer Sonata (2008) and Boxing Day (2012). The film premiered in competition at the Montreal World Film Festival (August 23 to September 3, 2012).

Plot
In 1992, Jack (Danny Huston), a legendary filmmaker, returns to Hollywood after a long absence. He is looking to secure finance for his new film project. His return to Tinseltown is heralded by a series of adventures, as he drinks freely, seduces a beautiful woman named Diana (Miller), quarrels with studio executives and finally procures funds for his new project by winning a poker game.

Twenty years on, the filmmaker's son (Jack Huston) arrives in Hollywood looking to make his directorial debut amid questions of whether he has inherited his father's gift.

Cast
 Danny Huston as Jack Hussar Senior
 Sienna Miller as Diana
 Jacqueline Bisset as Diana—twenty years later
 Jack Huston as Jack Hussar Junior
 Billy Zane as Max Faraday
 Izabella Miko as Dana
 Jamie Harris as Colin
 Richard Portnow as Lorenzo
 Lydia Hearst as Alexis
 Guy Burnet as Paul
 Hannah Cowley as Angel
 Julie Marcus as Intercom Voice

References

External links
 
 

2012 films
American independent films
Films set in 1992
Films set in 2012
Films set in Los Angeles
Films shot in Los Angeles
Films based on short fiction
Films based on works by Leo Tolstoy
Films directed by Bernard Rose (director)
Films with screenplays by Bernard Rose (director)
2010s English-language films
2010s American films